Sibyllinae is subfamily of mantises in the family Hymenopodidae. It was formerly classified as a separate family, Sibyllidae.

See also
List of mantis genera and species

References

Hymenopodidae
Mantodea subfamilies